The Aircraft Research Association (ARA) is an aerodynamics research institute in the north-west of Bedford.

History
The association was founded on 22 January 1952. 14 main British aviation companies funded £1.25m to build a large wind tunnel.

It was first proposed in 1953 to build the site at Stevington, north-east of Bedford. By March 1953, the current site was chosen.

Construction
Work started on Monday 7 September 1953.

The wind tunnel was fabricated by Moreland Hayne of east London.

The transonic tunnel first ran in April 1956.

Visits
The Duke of Edinburgh visited on the morning of Friday 4 May 1956. He had been planning to land by helicopter in the south-east of Bedford, and to be driven from there to the site by car, but weather conditions were unsuitable.

Structure
The site has the largest transonic wind tunnel in the UK, known as the TWT, with speeds up to Mach 1.4, powered by a Sulzer axial compressor. It is 25,000 hp electric-powered.

Wind tunnels
 Supersonic tunnel, Mach 1.4 - 3.5, built in 1958

Two hypersonic tunnels
 Mach 4-5 tunnel, built in 1965
 Mach 7 tunnel, built in 1968

Research
Projects worked on include Concorde, the Harrier and most Airbus aircraft. The Rolls-Royce RB211 was tested there.

The site now works with RUAG of Switzerland.

See also
 Aerospace Technology Institute, in Bedfordshire, launched in 2012 by the government as the UK Aerodynamics Centre
 British Hydromechanics Research Association (BHRA), also in Bedfordshire
 UK Aerospace Research Consortium (UK-ARC), formed in 2018, an alliance of university departments
 List of wind tunnels

References

External links
 ARA Bedford

1952 establishments in the United Kingdom
Aerospace engineering organizations
Aerospace industry in the United Kingdom
Engineering research institutes
Organisations based in Bedford
Research institutes established in 1952
Science and technology in Bedfordshire
Technology consortia
Wind tunnels